Kanaima is a genus of froghoppers endemic to Brazil & Argentina belonging to the family Cercopidae.

Species

 Kanaima katzensteinii Berg, 1879
 Kanaima fluvialis Lallemand, 1924
 Kanaima fusca Lallemand, 1927
 Kanaima nigra Brasil, RS

Excluded species
Four species formerly enclosed in Kanaima was transferred to Mahanarva Distant, 1909.

 Mahanarva vittata Walker, 1851
 Mahanarva fortunata Lallemand, 1924
 Mahanarva radiata Walker, 1851
 Mahanarva dubia Stancik & Cavichioli, 2003

References

 Schmidt E. 1910 - Neue Gattungen und Arten der Subfamilie Cercopinae Stal, ein Beitrag zur Kenntnis der Cercopiden (Hemiptera-Homoptera). Archiv für Naturgeschichte. Berlin 76: 53-112.

Auchenorrhyncha genera
Cercopidae